Benno Pludra (1 October 1925 – 27 August 2014) was a German children's author. He was born in Mückenberg, now Lauchhammer-West.

Pludra wrote narratives and novels for children and teenagers. More than five million copies of his books have been sold, which made him one of the most successful authors of East Germany. Some of his books were made into feature films. Pludra died in Potsdam in 2014, aged 88.

Works 
 Ein Mädchen, fünf Jungen und sechs Traktoren, Berlin 1951
 Die Jungen von Zelt dreizehn, Berlin 1952
 Gustel, Tapp und die andern, Berlin 1953
 In Wiepershagen krähn die Hähne, Berlin 1953
 Vor großer Fahrt, Berlin 1955
 Wenn die Heringe ziehn ..., Berlin 1955
 Haik und Paul, Berlin 1956
 Sheriff Teddy, Berlin 1956
 Jakob sucht Liebe, Berlin 1958
 Bootsmann auf der Scholle, Berlin 1959, 
 Popp muß sich entscheiden, Berlin 1959
 Heiner und seine Hähnchen, Berlin 1962 (with Ingeborg Meyer-Rey)
 Unser Schiff kommt von Kukkeia, Berlin 1962 (with Kurt Klamann)
 , Berlin 1963, 
 Die Reise nach Sundevit, Berlin 1965, 
 Vom Bären, der nicht mehr schlafen konnte, Berlin 1967 (with Ingeborg Meyer-Rey)
 Tambari, Berlin 1969
 Wie ich nach Swanetien reisen wollte, Berlin 1974
 Die Jungen von Zelt 13 und andere Erzählungen, Berlin 1975
 Sundus und der hafergelbe Hund, Berlin 1975
 Trauermantel und Birke, Berlin 1978
 Es waren einmal ein Paar Schuh, Berlin 1979 (with Renate Totzke-Israel)
 Drinnen schläft die Zaubermaus, Berlin 1980 (with Renate Totzke-Israel)
 Es war ein Ei, Berlin 1980 (with Linde Detlefsen)
 , Berlin 1980, 
 Manchmal sind wir schon ganz groß, Berlin 1980 (with Erdmut Oelschlaeger)
 Ein Mädchen fand einen Stein. Die Schwäne auf dem Wasser. Es waren einmal ein Paar Schuh, Berlin 1981 (with Martin Schoppe)
 Wie die Windmühle zu den Wolken flog, Berlin 1981 (with Siegfried Linke)
 Es war eine Biene, Berlin 1983 (with Manfred Bofinger)
 Verkehrte Welt, Berlin 1984 (with Gisela Neumann)
 Das Herz des Piraten, Berlin 1985
 Windmühle, Windmühle, nimm uns mit, Berlin 1987 (with Renate Totzke-Israel)
 Der Waldkauz Hadubrand, Berlin 1988 (with Jutta Mirtschin)
 Das Fräulein Weißmann saß im Garten, Berlin 1989 (with Regine Röder)
 Zum Fluß hinunter, wo die Schiffe ziehn, Berlin 1990
 Aloa-hé, Hamburg 1991
 Siebenstorch, Berlin 1991
 Schreiben für Kinder: Ganz hinten sollte Hoffnung sein, Frankfurt/M. 1993
 Fünf in der Tonne, Berlin 1994
 Leinen los für Wunderfloh, Berlin 1994
 Die Märchen, Berlin 1994
 Der Hund des Kapitäns, Berlin 1999
 Jakob heimatlos, Berlin 1999

Film adaptions 
 1957: Sheriff Teddy – directed by: Heiner Carow
 1964:  – directed by: Herrmann Zschoche
 1966: Die Reise nach Sundevit – directed by: Heiner Carow
 1977: Tambari – directed by: Ulrich Weiß
 1983:  – directed by: Herrmann Zschoche
 1988: Das Herz des Piraten – directed by: Jürgen Brauer

External links 

 
 
 
 Benno Pludra at beltz.de (German)

References 

1925 births
2014 deaths
German children's writers
German male writers